Antonino Ragusa (born 27 March 1990) is an Italian footballer who plays as a midfielder for  club Messina.

Club career

Treviso
Born in Messina, Sicily, Ragusa started his professional career at Veneto club Treviso, where he played for Allievi Nazionali under-17 team in 2006–07 season. In 2008–09 season, despite remained as a member of the under-20 team, Ragusa made his Serie B debut on 7 February 2009 against Rimini. The club bankrupted at the end of season.

Genoa
In July 2009 Ragusa was signed by Serie A club Genoa along with youngster Thomas Bonotto and Marco Bincoletto. Ragusa was a member of Genoa's under-20 team, the Primavera (literally: spring).

In August 2010 he was loaned to Lega Pro Prima Divisione (Italian third level) club Salernitana with an option to purchase. The club reached the promotion playoffs but losing to Verona in the finals. Ragusa himself was in the starting eleven in the playoffs as wing forward/winger in the 4–3–3/4–2–3–1 formation, to support Dino Fava along with Fabinho. In June 2011 Salernitana excised the option but Genoa also excised the counter-option for €100,000. At the end of season Salernitana also bankrupted again.

Reggina (loan)
On 27 June 2011 he was transferred to second division club Reggina, initially in co-ownership deal to compensate the signing of Francesco Acerbi. However the deal documented to Lega Serie B on 31 August 2011 along with Matteo D'Alessandro, but Ragusa became a loan deal. He picked no.90 shirt. Despite only half of the appearances as starter under former Salernitana coach Roberto Breda, Ragusa scored 6 goals in late September to October (round 6 to 12). Ragusa started most of the game fixture from October (round 9) to 10 December (round 19), partnering centre forward Emiliano Bonazzoli or Fabio Ceravolo in 3–4–1–2 formation (with Simone Missiroli as play-maker) The coach then used him to play as an attacking midfielder/wing forward in 4–2–3–1/4–3–3 formation. Ragusa was out-favoured by Breda in his last two games in charge, with the return of 3–5–2 featuring another forward Alessio Campagnacci to partner with Alessio Viola or Bonazzoli. Despite new coach Angelo Gregucci used 3–4–3 formation in his first game (against Modena), Ragusa remained on the bench. The coach again rotated its starting XI in order to find the best formation. Ragusa returned to starting XI in round 25 and again in round 27, as a right midfielder in 3–5–2 formation.

In June 2012 Reggina decided to sign Ragusa in co-ownership deal, however Genoa activated the counter-option that Genoa paid Reggina €50,000.

Pescara
Ragusa was signed by Serie A club Pescara in a co-ownership deal for €1.5 million on 30 July 2012. On 31 August 2012 he was loaned to Serie B newcomer Ternana along with team-mates Riccardo Brosco and Riccardo Maniero. After Pescara relegated, on 30 June 2013 the co-ownership deal was renewed as well as remaining in Pescara. Ragusa became a key player for the club despite they failed to return to Serie A immediately. On 20 June 2014 the co-ownership deal was renewed again.

Genoa return
Ragusa returned to Genoa in a temporary deal in July 2014. However, on 12 September 2014 Ragusa left for another Serie B newcomer Vicenza Calcio from Genoa for €60,000. In June 2015 Genoa bought back Ragusa for €725,000.

Cesena
On 14 July 2015 Ragusa was signed by Cesena for €2.5 million.

Sassuolo
On 26 August 2016 he was signed by Sassuolo. He made his debut against his former club Pescara on 28 August. However, he was deemed ineligible by Italian Football Federation, meaning the result was changed from a win for Sassuolo to an automatic 3–0 defeat.

Hellas Verona
On 3 August 2018, Ragusa joined to Serie B club Hellas Verona on loan until 30 June 2019 with obligatory buy.

Spezia
On 1 September 2019, Ragusa joined Spezia on loan until 30 June 2020.

Brescia
On 1 October 2020, Ragusa joined Brescia on loan with an option to buy.

Lecce
On 29 January 2022, he transferred on a permanent basis to Serie B club Lecce and signed a contract until 30 June 2022.

Messina
On 31 January 2023, Ragusa joined his hometown club Messina in Serie C.

International career
In November 2011 Ragusa received his first national team call-up. That month Ragusa played both rounds of 2013 UEFA European Under-21 Football Championship qualification. He was the left winger in the latter game (round 5) against Hungary.

References

External links
 Lega Serie B Profile 
 FIGC 
 Football.it Profile 
 
 

1990 births
Sportspeople from Messina
Footballers from Sicily
Living people
Italian footballers
Italy under-21 international footballers
Association football forwards
Serie A players
Serie B players
Treviso F.B.C. 1993 players
Genoa C.F.C. players
U.S. Salernitana 1919 players
Reggina 1914 players
Delfino Pescara 1936 players
Ternana Calcio players
Hellas Verona F.C. players
Spezia Calcio players
Brescia Calcio players
U.S. Lecce players
A.C.R. Messina players